A rhizome is a concept in post-structuralism describing a nonlinear network that "connects any point to any other point". It appears in the work of French theorists Deleuze and Guattari, who used the term in their book A Thousand Plateaus to refer to networks that establish "connections between semiotic chains, organizations of power, and circumstances relative to the arts, sciences and social struggles" with no apparent order or coherency. A rhizome is purely a network of multiplicities that are not arborescent (tree-like, or hierarchical, e.g. the idea of hypertext in literary theory) with properties similar to lattices. Deleuze referred to it as extending from his concept of an "image of thought" that he had previously discussed in Difference and Repetition.

As a mode of knowledge and model for society
Deleuze and Guattari use the terms "rhizome" and "rhizomatic" (from Ancient Greek ῥίζωμα, rhízōma, "mass of roots") to describe theory and research that allows for multiple, non-hierarchical entry and exit points in data representation and interpretation. In A Thousand Plateaus, they oppose it to an arborescent (hierarchic, tree-like) use of concepts, which works with dualist categories and binary choices. A rhizome works with planar and trans-species connections, while an arborescent model works with vertical and linear connections. Their use of the "orchid and the wasp" is taken from the biological concept of mutualism, in which two different species interact together to form a multiplicity (i.e. a unity that is multiple in itself). Hybridization and horizontal gene transfer are also rhizomatic in this sense.

Rather than narrativize history and culture, the rhizome presents history and culture as a map or wide array of attractions and influences with no specific origin or genesis, for a "rhizome has no beginning or end; it is always in the middle, between things, interbeing, intermezzo." The planar movement of the rhizome resists chronology and organization, instead favoring a nomadic system of growth and propagation.

In a rhizome, "culture spreads like the surface of a body of water, spreading towards available spaces or trickling downwards towards new spaces through fissures and gaps, eroding what is in its way. The surface can be interrupted and moved, but these disturbances leave no trace, as the water is charged with pressure and potential to always seek its equilibrium, and thereby establish smooth space."

Principles
Deleuze and Guattari introduce A Thousand Plateaus by outlining the concept of the rhizome (quoted from A Thousand Plateaus):

1 and 2. Principles of connection and heterogeneity: "...any point of a rhizome can be connected to any other, and must be";
3. Principle of multiplicity: it is only when the multiple is effectively treated as a substantive, "multiplicity", that it ceases to have any relation to the One;
4. Principle of asignifying rupture: a rhizome may be broken, but it will start up again on one of its old lines, or on new lines;
5 and 6. Principles of cartography and decalcomania: a rhizome is not amenable to any structural or generative model; it is a "map and not a tracing". They elaborate in the same section, "What distinguishes the map from the tracing is that it is entirely oriented toward an experimentation in contact with the real."

Arborescent

Arborescent refers to the shape and structure of a tree. The postmodern philosophers Deleuze and Guattari used the term to characterize a certain type of thinking, exemplified by the western scientific model, where knowledge emanates from a single stem and ends in predetermined 'fruits'. The concept suggests a linear progress towards the truth, which they condemned as both unrealistic and stultifying to the imagination. It is contrasted with 'rhizomatic' thinking, which is open ended, has no central structure, and is constantly changing. 

Arborescent thinking is marked by insistence on totalizing principles, binarism, and dualism. The term, first used (in western philosophy) in A Thousand Plateaus (1980) where it was opposed to the rhizome, comes from the way genealogy trees are drawn: unidirectional progress which enforces a dualist metaphysical conception, criticized by Deleuze. 

Rhizomes, on the contrary, mark a horizontal and non-hierarchical conception, where anything may be linked to anything else, with no respect whatsoever for specific species: rhizomes are heterogeneous links between things. For example, Deleuze and Guattari linked together desire and machines to create the concept of desiring machines). Horizontal gene transfer is also an example of rhizomes, opposed to the arborescent evolutionism theory. 

Deleuze also criticizes the Chomsky hierarchy of formal languages, which he considers a perfect example of arborescent dualistic theory.

See also

References

Sources
 Deleuze, Gilles and Félix Guattari. 1980. A Thousand Plateaus. Trans. Brian Massumi. London and New York: Continuum, 2004. Vol. 2 of Capitalism and Schizophrenia. 2 vols. 1972-1980. Trans. of Mille Plateaux. Paris: Les Editions de Minuit. .
 Guattari, Félix. 1995. Chaosophy. Ed. Sylvère Lotringer. Semiotext(e) Foreign Agents Ser. New York: Semiotext(e). .
 ---. 1996. Soft Subversions. Ed. Sylvère Lotringer. Trans. David L. Sweet and Chet Wiener. Semiotext(e) Foreign Agents Ser. New York: Semiotext(e). .

External links 
Rhizomes – Cultural Studies Online Journal.
Power of Networks – RSA Animate video on the "Power of Networks" by Manuel Lima (juxtaposes the tree vs. network approach).

Social networks
Social theories
Literary concepts
Philosophical analogies
Postmodern theory
Félix Guattari
Gilles Deleuze